Alan Kelly (born 13 July 1975) is an Irish politician and author who has been a Teachta Dála (TD) for the Tipperary constituency since the 2016 general election and a TD for the Tipperary North constituency from 2011 to 2016.

He previously served as the leader of the Labour Party from April 2020 to March 2022, Minister for the Environment, Community and Local Government and Deputy leader of the Labour Party from 2014 to 2016 and Minister of State for Public and Commuter Transport from 2011 to 2014. He was a Member of the European Parliament for the South constituency from 2009 to 2011 and a Senator for the Agricultural Panel from 2007 to 2009.

Kelly announced his resignation as Labour Party leader on 2 March 2022, but announced he would stay on as leader until a replacement was appointed. Ivana Bacik succeeded Kelly on 24 March.

Early life 
Kelly is from Portroe just outside Nenagh, County Tipperary. He is the son of Tom and Nan Kelly. His parents' house burned down in 1974, the year before he was born. Kelly was raised on a small dairy farm. His father left farming following the introduction of milk quotas by the European Council in the 1980s and found employment working on the roads for the local county council. Educated at Nenagh CBS, he subsequently attended University College Cork (UCC), where he completed a BA in English and History in 1995. Two years later he completed a M.Phil in Political History. Kelly continued his education at Boston College, where he achieved a Certificate in Leadership in 1999. He returned to Ireland shortly after this and completed a MBS in eCommerce in 2002. Kelly subsequently worked as an eBusiness Manager with Bord Fáilte and Fáilte Ireland.

Political career

Youth politics 
Kelly is thought to have been politicised from an early age. In his final year of secondary school, he canvassed for the Labour Party during the 1992 general election. He remained active in left-wing politics in university, firstly by establishing the Jim Kemmy Branch of the Labour Party in UCC. He then became involved in a number of by-elections, local election campaigns in Cork and in the wider Munster area. He has stated that he was “politically socialised in Cork.”

Kelly became Chair of Labour Youth in 2000, having previously served as co-chair. In 2001 he was a member of the General Council. In 2001 and 2002 he was director of the Tom Johnson Summer School and was also a member of the General Election Planning Committee in the period 2001–2002.

Seanad Éireann: 2007–2009 
In 2007, Kelly launched his own political career when he secured election to Seanad Éireann by the Agricultural Panel. He was the only Labour Party candidate in that grouping. After the election of Eamon Gilmore as leader of the Labour Party in 2007, Kelly was appointed as Labour Party Spokesperson on Tourism and was Seanad Spokesperson on Finance and Local Government.

European Parliament: 2009–2011 
Kelly was elected as a Member of the European Parliament for the South constituency, at the 2009 European Parliament election, taking the last seat in a tight battle between him, Sinn Féin's Toireasa Ferris and the Independent Kathy Sinnott. Kelly was a member of the European Parliament's Committee on Internal Market and Consumer Protection. He also served on the Delegation for Relations with the United States.

Dáil Éireann: 2011–present

31st Dail & Junior Ministry 
Though he promised he would see out his five-year term in the European Parliament, Kelly allowed his name to go forward as a Labour Party candidate at the 2011 general election. He ran in the Tipperary North constituency and was successful, receiving 9,559 first preference votes (19.8%) and securing the third and final seat at the expense of Fianna Fáil's sitting TD, Máire Hoctor. Phil Prendergast replaced him as MEP for the South constituency.

When the new coalition government was formed, Kelly joined the junior ministerial ranks as Minister of State for Public and Commuter Transport. Kelly began receiving death threats during this period.

Labour Party deputy leadership and cabinet minister (2014–2016) 
He was elected as deputy leader of the Labour Party on 4 July 2014. On 11 July 2014, he was appointed Minister of the Environment, Community and Local Government. New Labour leader Joan Burton originally considered appointing deputy Alex White to the role, however, she decided that the former barrister was better suited to the “legally orientated portfolio” of the Communications ministry. However she gave the Environment, Community and Local Government ministry to Kelly, who was described as "combative." When Kelly was given his ministerial role, he initially believed that property tax would be the big issue, but within a week realised that it would be the matter of implementation of water charges and the Irish Water as required by the EU Water Framework Directive. Kelly claimed that his predecessor, Phil Hogan, had "designed the ditches" and that he now had to "drive the tractor through." Kelly also complained of the position that he had been left with upon becoming accustomed to the role. The cabinet had previously been told by the ERSI that the cost-benefit analysis on water metering was "robust" and based on "realistic and achievable assumptions regarding the benefits." However, by the time Kelly inherited the ministry, "it had fallen apart," according to Michael Brennan in his 2019 book In Deep Water: How People, Politics and Protests sank Irish Water.

Kelly was appointed Labour's director of elections and chair of their national campaign committee ahead of the general election.

His involvement in Irish Water was extremely controversial during his tenure as minister. He received death threats on a regular basis during his tenure as minister. As Minister, Kelly announced a two-year rent freeze to combat the housing crisis. He said that "blockages" had made solving the housing crisis difficult. A law brought in by Kelly was criticised by the Irish Planning Institute (IPI), who said that it would increase ministerial planning powers over local authorities and could significantly change how planning operates in Ireland. Councillors opposed to the law said that it was a "power grab", and claimed it could significantly limits the planning powers of local government. In November 2014, the Independent reported that Kelly had received death threats. Also in November 2014 he claimed that he had received four death threats from "anonymous warriors" in a single week. Kelly's constituency office received a bomb threat in November 2014. In December 2014 it was reported that a staff member who answered a call was told "a bullet will be put in his head before the end of the day. And we'll come down and put a bullet in your head too, you rich f**k. We won't be paying water charges." A threatening letter sent to his office in 2015 containing a 'suspicious powder' was declared a hoax by the Gardai and the Defence Forces. EU Commissioner Phil Hogan moved to distance himself from the controversies with Irish Water by stressing that Kelly was now in charge of water. Barry Cowen claimed in relation to a policy change that "the issue with the policy is that everytime Alan Kelly picks up a phone to a journalist, his policy for Irish Water changes and it’s become absolutely farcical."

In 2015, the Business Post claimed that Kelly  “ignored expert advice by giving €1.5 million in grants to towns in his new constituency,” stating that  was responsible for the active travel towns scheme, which provides funding for walking and cycling routes to get people to switch from their cars. He gave €1 million to Clonmel and more than €500,000 to Thurles under the scheme, even though projects from other towns “got significantly higher marks” in assessments.

In December 2015 Kelly became emotional as he strongly denied claims that he had leaked information about the Labour Party to the media. A number of Labour TDs identified him as the source of a leak of an internal analysis which suggested that Labour would lose up to 20 seats at the upcoming general election.

Kelly attracted further controversy following a January 2016 interview in the Sunday Independent headlined 'Alan Kelly: "Power is a drug . . . it suits me"'. He later clarified the context in a June 2020 interview with The Mirror, saying; “I did say those words, but everybody forgets about the dot, dot, dot in the middle. I’ve nothing against the journalist now, but if you read it, power is a drug, it suits me, there’s a dot, dot, dot in the middle. The conversation was about how some people are always in opposition and will never want to go into government. Some people, you know, being in government suits them. They’re able to handle it or deal with it, or whatever. That was the conversation and I suppose power, being in power, being in government are interchangeable words, so that was the context of it. But when you’re explaining you’re losing".

Kelly attracted controversy for his former association with John Delaney of the FAI and denied claims that Delaney was stopping people and asking them to vote for him during the 2016 general election campaign. Delaney had asked people to support Kelly on MidWest Radio. Kelly insisted that having Delaney support him was not a form of cronyism. Following the election, Kelly remained Minister for the Environment, Community and Local Government in an acting capacity during prolonged talks on government formation.

Writing on Kelly in How Ireland Voted 2016: The Election Nobody Won, the authors claimed that Phil Hogan left “the controversy surrounding water charges remained for his successor, Labour's Alan Kelly, to deal with.”

Opposition and leadership challenges (2016–2020) 

In May 2016, Kelly announced his intention to seek leadership of the Labour Party. However, he failed to attract a nomination from his parliamentary colleagues, resulting in the unopposed appointment of Brendan Howlin as the new leader. Kelly was not present at the conference at which Howlin was announced as leader. One TD who was present described Kelly's no-show as "childish" and "disrespectful". Kelly was adamant that Howlin "blocked" his leadership ambitions by warning colleagues that he would not stand if there was a contest. Later, Kelly tweeted an image of seven pints of Guinness lined up, ranging from full to half empty, with the cryptic message: "The seven stages of leadership". He was reportedly "considering his future in politics after being left humiliated by his parliamentary party," according to the Irish Independent. Sarah McInerney of The Times wrote an opinion piece supporting Kelly titled 'The man we love to hate should be leading Labour.'

Grassroots efforts to put pressure on members of the parliamentary party were unsuccessful. The parliamentary party also decided not to nominate any candidates for the position of deputy leader, leaving Kelly's previous position vacant. When asked by Hot Press if he felt 'shafted', he replied saying; "Yes. I was pretty annoyed about what happened. It was a difficult period but I’ve moved on. There are no issues. I don't bear grudges. But you don't forget. You put it inward and you use it for motivation – and you move on." In the same interview he said that it was 'wrong' that the grassroots membership couldn't have a say. In Spring 2017, Kelly was approached to join Fine Gael by the Tipperary organisation, which he declined. A source believed to be close to Kelly confirmed this to be true but said that "Alan has time and time again said that Labour values are in his DNA and that's certainly true. He's always talking about workers and the value of work. He is certainly not one of those who just pander to the welfare or liberal agendas that Labour has become so associated with. His ambition is to drag the Labour Party back towards what he believes in rather than ever leave it".

In a Hot Press interview in 2017, he described himself as a practicing Catholic and said that he is very liberal on 'most issues'. He stated that he was opposed to the legalisation of prostitution, but was in favour of the legalisation of marijuana.

In September 2017, Kelly called for the HPV vaccine to be given to all schoolboys in Ireland. The vaccine's roll-out among girls had recently been subject to controversy over its alleged side effects.

In November 2017, Kelly was criticised by his Labour colleagues after he warned leader Brendan Howlin that he has less than six months to turn the party's fortunes around.  However, the chair of the Association of Labour Councillors, Dermot Lacey, said: "If there had been an election [in 2016], I would have voted for Alan. If there is an election, I will vote for him. At the moment there isn't a contest."

In August 2018, Kelly challenged Howlin for the party leadership. His challenge failed due to lack of support from his parliamentary colleagues. The Irish Independent described his efforts to become leader as 'persistent'.

In 2020, Kelly was re-elected to represent the Tipperary constituency during the February general election, obtaining 13,222 first preference votes (9.6%) and thus securing the fourth of five available seats.  As of 2020, Kelly was Labour's spokesperson on health.

Labour Party leader (2020–2022) 

After Brendan Howlin's intention to stand down as party leader following the 2020 general election, Kelly was nominated by two of the party's six TDs; Seán Sherlock and Duncan Smith. Kelly was also publicly supported by former Labour TDs Jan O'Sullivan and Willie Penrose. Launching his election bid, Kelly said that a complete rebuild of the Labour Party was needed. On 3 April 2020, he was announced as the new leader of the Labour Party, having won 55% of the vote. Kelly became noted for his outspoken style following his election as leader. In May 2020, he appeared to rule out going into a coalition government.

He announced his resignation as party leader on 2 March 2022, citing a lack of confidence in his leadership from party colleagues as the reason. He announced he would stay on as leader until a replacement was appointed, and would remain as a TD for Tipperary. Ivana Bacik succeeded Kelly on 24 March.

Personal life 
Kelly is married to Regina O'Connor, a primary school teacher who was raised in Waterville, County Kerry. The couple have two children; a daughter and a son. His brother is former US Special Envoy for Northern Ireland and former CEO of Teneo, Declan Kelly. He is the author of A Political History of County Tipperary 1916–1997 and has won numerous rugby and hurling medals according to his Labour Party summary.

Kelly co-owns a racing greyhound named 'Akay Forty Seven'. During a Dáil debate in December 2020, Kelly said that "with regard to greyhound people, many of whom are working-class people, greyhounds are effectively their horses." He did not support a Social Democrats motion seeking to end State funding of the industry.

As of 2021, Kelly owned a holiday home in Co. Kerry, that he let out using Airbnb. In an interview with Pat Kenny on Newstalk, he stated that "I have an issue with Airbnb in urban areas, rather than rural areas." According to the Irish Independent, it was used for short-term letting. He added that the house is based in "a small population area", but felt that Airbnbs in urban areas were in need of regulation.

References

External links 
 
 Alan Kelly's page on the Labour Party website
 

1975 births
Living people
Alumni of University College Cork
Alumni of University College Dublin
Labour Party (Ireland) MEPs
Labour Party (Ireland) TDs
Members of the 23rd Seanad
Members of the 31st Dáil
Members of the 32nd Dáil
Members of the 33rd Dáil
MEPs for the Republic of Ireland 2009–2014
Ministers for the Environment (Ireland)
Ministers of State of the 31st Dáil
Politicians from County Tipperary
Labour Party (Ireland) senators
Leaders of the Labour Party (Ireland)